Mount Waldo is a small mountain about  high in Waldo County, Maine. It is located in the town of Frankfort.

Mt. Waldo granite was once the stock in trade of a thriving industry. The Mount Waldo Granite has a coarse-grained texture which gives it a more patchy, mottled look than the finer-grained granites.  Although granite is no longer quarried here, it can still be seen in buildings in many eastern cities, such as New York, Washington, D.C., and Philadelphia.

The combination of bare rock ledges and proximity to tidewater made this granite amenable to quarrying in the early 19th century. The two significant quarries in the Mount Waldo Granite in the 19th century were on the northeast flank of Mount Waldo itself, and near the top of Mosquito Mountain. According to a description of the operations from the early 20th century, the quarried stone was taken over graded tracks, operated by gravity, to cutting sheds and wharfs on Marsh River. From there it was taken on the Penobscot River and distributed to eastern ports in Massachusetts, New York, and Philadelphia, and to "western" cities of Chicago, Milwaukee, and Cleveland.  The granite from Mt. Waldo was used for structures such as the Washington Monument, the U.S. Senate Office Building, the Tomb of the Unknown Soldier, the United Nations Building, the Philadelphia Mint, the Empire State Building, and several piers that support the Brooklyn Bridge

The operator of the quarry was the Mount Waldo Granite Works of Frankfort. Granite from the quarry was reportedly a medium gray color. The quarry located at Mt. Waldo has been unused since 1914. The surviving elements of the quarry works were listed on the National Register of Historic Places in 1974.

See also
National Register of Historic Places listings in Waldo County, Maine

References

External links
Mount Waldo Hikes
Photodocumentary about the Quarry today

Waldo
Mining in Maine
Waldo
Historic districts on the National Register of Historic Places in Maine
National Register of Historic Places in Waldo County, Maine